The M13 is a short metropolitan route in Johannesburg, South Africa. It begins in the northern suburbs of Johannesburg in an area formally called Randburg.

Route 
The M13 begins its northern direction at Republic Road's intersection of Judges Avenue (M8) and the southern part of Republic Road (M20) in Cresta. It heads north through Windsor East and Windsor passing by the Randpark Golf Club. It then passes north through Randpark and Robin Hills before turning eastwards as it passes the suburbs of Fontainebleau and Malanshof and reaches the intersection of Malibongwe Drive (R512). It crosses the intersection, still as Republic Road and continues east into Fernadale where it intersects and crosses Bram Fischer Drive (M71) and shortly thereafter Jan Smuts Avenue (M27) in Bordeaux. Staying as Republic Road, the route turns north-east through Hurlingham and ends shortly thereafter as a t-junction at William Nicol Drive (M81).

References 

Streets and roads of Johannesburg
Metropolitan routes in Johannesburg